Powdr Corporation, stylized as POWDR, is an American privately held company that owns and operates ski resorts in the United States and Canada. It is headquartered in Park City, Utah, and was founded in 1994 by John Cumming, co-founder of the clothing company Mountain Hardwear.

History

Powdr was founded by John Cumming in 1994 with the purchase of the Park City Mountain Resort in  Park City, Utah, about 30 miles outside of Salt Lake City. Later that year, the company bought the Alpine Meadows ski resort near Lake Tahoe, California. In August 1995, the company bought the Boreal Mountain Resort resort near Lake Tahoe and the Soda Springs ski area near the Donner Summit by Soda Springs, Nevada County, California. In April 2001, Powdr bought the Mount Bachelor ski area in Central Oregon. The company bought Las Vegas Ski and Snowboard Resort in November 2003. Powder bought the Killington and the Pico Mountain ski resorts near Killington, Vermont, from American Skiing Company in May 2007, and in December 2019 Powdr purchased SilverStar Mountain Resort, its first mountain resort in Canada.

In July 2007, Powdr sold Alpine Meadows to JMA Ventures.

In 2008, Powdr bought the Outside TV media venture, which it later sold in 2021 to Pocket Outdoor Media, which simultaneously renamed itself to Outside.

Powdr bought Copper Mountain in Colorado in December 2009 from Intrawest. Powdr bought "World of Adventure Sports Presented by GoPro", an Emmy Award-winning TV series on December 3, 2013.

In July 2011, Powdr bought a majority share of Camp Woodward, an operator of youth summer camps established in 1970. As of 2022, Camp Woodward destinations include Woodward Mt. Bachelor, Woodward Tahoe, Woodward West, Woodward Park City, Woodward Copper, Woodward Eldora, Woodward Pennsylvania and Woodward Killington. Woodward Sydney is planned to open in 2024.

In June 2016, Powdr bought the 55-year-old Eldora Mountain Resort near Boulder, Colorado. 

In December 2019, Powdr opened Woodward Park City youth sports complex.

Lawsuits

Non-honoring of certain passes issued by prior Killington owner

In July 2010, a federal judge dismissed a class action lawsuit against Killington Resort over so-called 'lifetime' ski passes. Judge Christina Reiss found that the resort's current owner (Powdr) was under no legal obligation to honor previously issued investor season passes when it purchased Killington Resort in 2007.

Loss of Park City lease

When Park City Mountain Resort, a Powdr resort, mistakenly failed to renew a "sweetheart lease" for a portion of its ski terrain acreage, the company was eventually evicted from the property and, after a protracted legal fight, "reluctantly" sold its remaining area assets to Vail Resorts for approximately 180 million dollars in late 2014.

Properties

Ski resorts

Western United States 
 California
Boreal Mountain Resort
Soda Springs
 Colorado
Copper Mountain
Eldora Mountain Resort
 Nevada
Lee Canyon
 Oregon
Mt. Bachelor
 Utah
Snowbird
Woodward Park City

Northeast United States 
Killington Ski Resort, Vermont
Pico Mountain, Vermont

Canada 
 Silver Star Mountain Resort, Vernon, British Columbia

Camp Woodward youth camp locations
Bend, Oregon; Mt. Bachelor, Oregon; Tahoe, California; Southern California; Snowbird, Utah; Park City, Utah, Copper Mountain, Colorado; Eldora Mountain, Colorado, Killington Mountain, Vermont, and Woodward Pennsylvania.

Other operations 

 Sun Country Tours, Oregon
 Powderbird Helicopter Skiing, Utah

Former properties
Alpine Meadows, California
Park City Mountain Resort, Utah (sale to Vail Resorts announced September 11, 2014)

References

Companies based in Utah
Skiing organizations
1994 establishments in Utah